Ahmed Belhadji  (born 16 November 1997) is an Moroccan professional footballer who plays as a midfielder for Egyptian Premier League club Zamalek.

References 

Moroccan footballers
Living people
1997 births
Zamalek SC players